Bilkerur is a village in the southern state of Karnataka, India. It is located in the Bagalkot taluk of Bagalkot district.

References

Villages in Bagalkot district